Morchard Road railway station is located in the village of Down St Mary in Devon, England. It is named after the village of Morchard Bishop which lies a few miles to the north-east. The station and trains are operated by Great Western Railway.

History 
The station was opened with the North Devon Railway on 1 August 1854. It had a passing loop but no signal box until 1 October 1873. The main building, including a house for the station master, was on the platform used by trains going north towards Barnstaple while the 12-lever wooden signal box and a stone waiting shelter were provided on the other platform. There were two sidings on the north end of the Barnstaple platform. Another siding at the south end of the platform was used when two long trains needed to pass.

The goods yard was closed on 30 December 1963 and the passing loop removed when the signal box was closed on 6 March 1964. Since 12 September 1965 it has been unstaffed.

Description 
The former northbound platform is now used by trains in both directions; the old southbound platform has been demolished. There is a waiting shelter for passengers but the stationmaster's house is now in private use.

Services 
All services at Morchard Road are operated by Great Western Railway.

Community railway 
The railway between Exeter and Barnstaple is designated as a community railway and is supported by marketing provided by the Devon and Cornwall Rail Partnership. The line is promoted as the Tarka Line.

References

External links
93 second video of Morchard Road railway station on YouTube

Railway stations in Devon
Railway stations in Great Britain opened in 1854
Former London and South Western Railway stations
Railway stations served by Great Western Railway
Railway request stops in Great Britain
DfT Category F1 stations